No Man Is an Island is a 1962 war film about the exploits of George Ray Tweed, a United States Navy radioman who avoided capture and execution by the Japanese during their years-long World War II occupation of Guam. It stars Jeffrey Hunter as Tweed. The film was shot entirely in the Philippines and all the supporting actors spoke Tagalog rather than Chamorro, to the amusement of Chamorros who saw the film.

Plot
It is 1941. Tweed is at a radio outpost on Guam from where he expects to return to mainland America. His replacement, Roy, arrives with Vicente, a local. Shortly after bombing Pearl Harbor, the Japanese attack Guam by air, killing Vicente and Chief Schultz. The five survivors from the outpost run for the hills as Japanese troops garrison the island.

Using medical documents from American prisoners the Japanese realise the five men are missing. The Japanese send patrols to capture the men, starting a long cat-and-mouse sequence. With help from locals the five escape one Japanese patrol but their evasion is short lived. Roy, who has lost a shoe, steps on a scorpion, the toxins weakening him and slowing the escape party. Tweed hides Roy with some brush and gives him a pistol, promising he'll "be back for the gun". Turney decides to surrender with Roy, arguing the Japanese will care for Roy's foot and they will be unharmed as prisoners of war. Turney uses his white shirt to signal the Japanese but is promptly killed. Panicking, Roy kills a Japanese soldier, before being killed himself. Chico, another American radioman, attempts to shoot at the Japanese but Tweed restrains him so they can remain hidden.

The three surviving Americans meet Sus Quintagua on a copra plantation, who promises to take them to his boss Santos, who will know where they can hide. Smuggling the Americans past a Japanese roadblock turns fatal, however, when Chico is killed by a stray shot from a drunken Japanese officer. Quintagua reveals that he has hidden an old radio, which the two Americans repair. When the radio's battery dies, Quintagua and Sonnenberg travel back to their abandoned jeep to retrieve its battery. Meanwhile, Tweed escapes another searching Japanese patrol but not before discovering the bound and beheaded bodies of Sonnenberg and Quintagua.

Tweed, now the sole survivor, makes it to a leprosy hospital, where he is cared for by a priest and his assistant. Tweed is told the Japanese would not dare visit the hospital so he will be safe. The hospital has a functioning radio. Tweed uses a typewriter to relay news he hears on the radio into a makeshift newspaper called the Guam Eagle, which is secretly shared among locals. The plan goes awry when the newspaper, meant to be read and then burned, incites locals to rebel against the Japanese. The Japanese learn of the Guam Eagle and Shimoda, reading one of the newspapers, smells medicine which leads them to believe Tweed is hiding in the leprosy hospital. When the Japanese search the hospital Tweed hides in the leprosy isolation ward, where Japanese soldiers do not search as they are too horrified by the patients. A fire starts accidentally and, despite efforts to extinguish it, the hospital burns down. The priest, suspected of distributing the newspaper, is taken away for questioning.

Tweed awakes to find the priest's assistant and a man named Antonio Cruz. Cruz fears for his family because the Japanese have warned anyone helping Tweed will be executed, but instead hides Tweed at the top of a large rock face where there is a cave. Antonio promises to bring supplies every now and then. Tweed meets Antonio's beautiful daughter Josephina, or "Joe", who brings supplies in her father's stead. A nearby Japanese patrol is alerted to Tweed's position by an alarm clock that Joe brought with her. Tweed converts the alarm clock into a warning signal should anyone approach his location. Frustrated at not capturing Tweed, the Japanese warn that if Tweed is not surrendered, dead or alive, after one month they will burn a farm in each district. Tweed, overcome with guilt, considers surrender but is stopped by Antonio and the priest's assistant. The two men take Tweed's dog-tags, stating they will "give him dead". Under the cover of night, the locals take the body of the recently deceased Shimoda to the sea, where his flesh is eaten by crabs, leaving only a skeleton with Tweed's dog-tags on it.

Antonio's family and the newly released priest and his assistant celebrate Christmas 1943 with Tweed, during which Tweed learns the Japanese military is reconfiguring forces in preparation for the US attack. Tweed discovers a Japanese gun position and, using a mirror, warns an American ship of the danger. Tweed asks Joe not to visit again because he fears it is too dangerous. Later that night, the American ship signals Tweed but inadvertently alerts the Japanese to his position. Tweed signals that he has vital information and manages to reach the safety of the ship, during which his Japanese pursuers are killed.

After the battle ends with an American victory, Tweed re-unites with Antonio and his family, embracing Joe on top of the rock where Tweed had successfully evaded the Japanese for so long.

Cast
 Jeffrey Hunter as George R. Tweed
 Marshall Thompson as Jonn Sonnenberg
 Barbara Perez as 'Joe' Cruz
 Ronald Remy as Chico Torres
 Paul Edwards Jr. as Al Turney
 Rolf Bayer as Chief Schultz
 Vicente Liwanag as Vicente
 Fred Harris II as Roy Lund
 Lamberto V. Avellana as Mr. Shimoda
 Chichay as Mrs. Nakamura
 Antonio de la Mogueis as Florecito
 Vic Silayan as Major Hondo
 Bert Laforteza as Comdr. Oto Harada (as Bert La Fortesa)
 Eddie Infante as Sus Quitugua
 Nardo Ramos as Tumon
 Rosa Mia as Primera Quitugua
 Mike Anzures as Santos
 Bruno Punzalan as Himself
 Joseph de Cordova as Father Pangolin
 Mario Barri as Limtiaco
 Steve Joseph as Tommy Tanaka
 Ding Tello as Japanese sergeant major
 Bert Olivar as Antonio Cruz
 Nena Ledesma as Himself
 Veronica Palileo as Josefa Cruz
 Segundo Veloria as Himself

Production
During filming, a sailor and a Filipino civilian were killed while preparing an explosion for the film. It led to calls for servicemen not to be used as extras on films and for films to use civilian experts for special effects.

References

External links

1962 films
American biographical films
American war films
Films set in Guam
Films shot in the Philippines
World War II films based on actual events
Pacific War films
Japan in non-Japanese culture
1960s English-language films
1960s American films
Universal Pictures films